Rhinotus is a genus of millipedes in the family Siphonotidae. There are at least 20 described species in Rhinotus.

Species
These species belong to the genus Rhinotus:

 Rhinotus acuticonus (Attems, 1910)
 Rhinotus albifrons Mauriès, 1980 c g
 Rhinotus angulifer (Chamberlin, 1940) i
 Rhinotus bivittatus (Pocock, 1898) c g
 Rhinotus celebensis Carl, 1912 c g
 Rhinotus centralis (Chamberlin, 1940) i
 Rhinotus crassiceps (Attems, 1900)
 Rhinotus demfiuranus Carl, 1912 g
 Rhinotus dempuranus Carl, 1912 c g
 Rhinotus densepilosus Golovatch & Korsós, 1992 c g
 Rhinotus ducalis Carl, 1926 c g
 Rhinotus hicksoni (Pocock, 1894) c g
 Rhinotus hispidus Carl, 1926 c g
 Rhinotus mjoebergi Verhoeff, 1924 c g
 Rhinotus modestus Carl, 1926 c g
 Rhinotus panamanus (Loomis, 1964) i
 Rhinotus purpureus (Pocock, 1894) i c g b
 Rhinotus trichocephalus Carl, 1912 c g
 Rhinotus vanmoli Mauriès, 1980 c g
 Rhinotus variabilis Attems, 1930 c g

Data sources: i = ITIS, c = Catalogue of Life, g = GBIF, b = Bugguide.net

References

Further reading

 
 

Polyzoniida
Myriapod genera
Articles created by Qbugbot